Loving and Free is the third album by English singer Kiki Dee released in 1973 on The Rocket Record Company label. It was recorded at the AIR Studios and Nova Studios in London between 28 April and 22 June 1973.

In 1976	the title track was issued as an EP (b/w "Amoureuse") and reached No. 13 in the UK Singles Chart.

Track listing

Charts

Personnel
Drums - Dave Mattacks (1,4,5,8), Gerry Conway (2,7,9,10), Nigel Olsson (3,6)
Percussion - Dave Mattacks (4)
Bass - Dee Murray (All tracks)
Guitars - Paul Keogh (1,2,4,5,9), Davey Johnstone (3,6,7,8,10)
Acoustic guitar - Jim Ryan (8)
Pedal steel - B. J. Cole (7,10)
Electric Piano - Elton John (2,7,9,10)
Piano - Jimmy Hill (1,2,4,5,7,10), Elton John (3,6), Ronnie Leakie (8)
Mellotron - Elton John (3,5,10)
Organ - Jimmy Hill (2,9), Elton John (7)
Saxophone - Roger Ball (4)
Backing vocals - Lesley Duncan, Kay Garner, Irene & Doreen Chanter (2,4,5,6,9,10), Elton John (7)
Orchestral arrangement - John Barnhan (1,8)

Production
Producers - Elton John, Clive Franks
Engineer - Clive Franks
Assistant Engineers - Judy Szekely, Denny Bridges
Orchestral Engineer - Richard Dodd
Album Photography - Steve Brown
Album Design - David Costa

References

1973 albums
The Rocket Record Company albums
Albums produced by Elton John
Kiki Dee albums